Helen Margaret Hodgson, née Applin (born 19 August 1961) is a former Western Australian state politician of the Australian Democrats party. Born in Bristol, England, she migrated to Australia in 1963. She was a lecturer in taxation at Curtin University in Perth before being elected in 1996 to the Western Australian Legislative Council, representing North Metropolitan Region from 1997 until 2001 when she was defeated and retired from politics, returning to teaching.

References

1961 births
Living people
Australian Democrats politicians
Members of the Western Australian Legislative Council
21st-century Australian politicians
Women members of the Western Australian Legislative Council
21st-century Australian women politicians